The following is a list of television programming blocks.

0–9
4Kids TV
120% Cartoon Network

A
ABC Daytime
ABC Kids (United States)
ABC Kids (Australia)
ABC's Wide World of Entertainment
ABC 4 Kids
ACME Night
Action Pack
Adult Swim
Adult Swim (Australia)
Adult Swim (UK & Ireland)
AKTV
Animation Domination
Animation Domination (Australia)
Animation Fixation
Animation Salvation
The Animation Station
Anime Complex
Anime Current
Aussie Gold
Animation Rules

B
Belajar dari Rumah
Big Fun Weeknights
Bionix
BKN
Book TV

C
Cartoon Quest
Cartoonito
CBBC
CBS Block Party
CBS Daytime
CBS Kidshow
Chispavision
CITV
CNN Newsroom
Comedytime Saturday
Cookie Jar Kids Network
Cookie Jar Toons
Cookie Jar TV
Crimetime After Primetime
Crimetime Saturday
Cúla 4
The CW Daytime
The CW4Kids
Cyw

D
Discovery Kids on NBC
The Disney Afternoon
Disney Channel Saturday Mornings
Disney Junior
Disney's One Too

F
Fox Box
Fox Kids
Fred Flintstone and Friends
Friday Night Stand-Up with Greg Giraldo
Fully Baked on FX
The Funtastic World of Hanna-Barbera

G
Galamiguitos
Get Real!
Giorgiomania
Good Night Show
Gotta See Saturdays

H
Hanna–Barbera's World of Super Adventure

J
Jetix

K
Kids' CBC
Kids' WB
Kids' WB Australia

L
La Piñata Loca (Univision)
Limbo
LittleBe
Litton's Weekend Adventure
Lose Control

M
The Marvel Action Hour
Marvel Action Universe
Mi Tele
MiTelemundo
Mixy
Milkshake!
Mornings on Ten
Musical Mornings with Coo
Must See TV
MSNBC Reports

N
NBC Daytime
NBC Kids
Nick: The Smart Place to Play
Nick in the Afternoon
Nick Jr.
NickMom
NickRewind
Nickelodeon en Telemundo
Nickelodeon on CBS
Nickelodeon Splat!
Nick Studio 10
Nick at Nite
NoitaminA

O
Operation Prime Time

P
PBS Kids
PBS Kids Go!
Pillow Head Hour
Planeta U
Platavision
PBS Kids Bookworm Bunch
Playhouse Disney

Q
Qubo
Qubo Night Owl

R
Ready Set Learn
The Rudy and Gogo World Famous Cartoon Show
Rage

S
S.C.I.F.I. World
Saturday Disney
Saturday Supercade
Scooby's All-Star Laff-A-Lympics
SNICK
Stwnsh
Sunny Side Up Show
Super Hero Time
Super Sunday
Super Fun Saturdays

T
TEENick
TeenNick (UK & Ireland)
Telemundo Infantil
Telemundo Kids
Telemuñequitos
Teletoon at Night
TGIF
The CW4Kids
TNBC
Tom and Jerry's Funhouse on TBS
Too Funny To Sleep
Toon Disney
Tickle U
Toonami
Toonami (Australia)
Toonami (Pakistan)
Toonin' Saturdays
Toonturama
Toonturama Junior
Toonzai
The Trifect
Tube Time
TVOKids

U
UPN Kids
USA Action Extreme Team
USA Cartoon Express
Univision y Los Niños
Univision Infantiles

V
Vortexx

W
Wiggly Waffle
What a Cartoon!

Y
Yogi's Space Race
YTV Jr.

Z
The Zone

¡
¡De Cabeza! (Univision)

See also
Block programming
List of animated programming blocks
List of Disney TV programming blocks
List of programming blocks by Cartoon Network (Philippines)

References

 
Name